South Wimbledon is a London Underground station in South Wimbledon, a suburb of Wimbledon in south-west London. The station is on the Northern line, situated between Colliers Wood and Morden stations. It is located on the corner of Merton High Street (A238) and Morden Road (A219). South Wimbledon is on the boundary between Travelcard Zone 3 and Zone 4.

History
The station was opened on 13 September 1926 as part of the Morden extension of the City & South London Railway south from Clapham Common. On the original plan it had the name "Merton Grove". For geographical accuracy, the station was shown as "South Wimbledon (Merton)" on tube maps from 1928, the name was also modified on platform signage, though not on the station building at street level. From the early-1950s, the "(Merton)" parenthetical fell out of use.

Along with the other stations on the Morden extension, the building was designed by architect Charles Holden. They were Holden's first major project for the Underground. He was selected by Frank Pick, general manager of the Underground Electric Railways Company of London (UERL), to design the stations after he was dissatisfied with designs produced by the UERL's own architect, Stanley Heaps. Built with a shop to each side, the modernist design takes the form of a double-height box clad in white Portland stone with a three-part glazed screen on the front façade divided by columns of which the capitals are three-dimensional versions of the Underground roundel. The central panel of the screen contains a large version of the roundel. The station is a Grade II listed building.

The station is the southernmost station on the London Underground network which has platforms in tunnels (Morden is in an open cut).

Connections
London Buses routes 57, 93, 131, 152, 219, and night route N155 serve the station.

Connection to Bus Route 470 and Tramlink at Morden Road tram stop is within walking distance of the station.

Future

A planned new line to the Tramlink light rail or a separate bus rapid transit (BRT) system called the Sutton Link will create a new tram or BRT/tube interchange with new platforms built at South Wimbledon somewhere close to the current station as part of Option 1, offering services to Sutton via St Helier.

Notes and references

Notes

References

External links

London Transport Museum Photographic Archive

More pictures of this station

Northern line stations
Tube stations in the London Borough of Merton
Former City and South London Railway stations
Railway stations in Great Britain opened in 1926
Charles Holden railway stations
Art Deco architecture in London
Grade II listed buildings in the London Borough of Merton
Grade II listed railway stations
London Underground Night Tube stations